The 2010–11 Florida Panthers season was the team's 18th season in the National Hockey League (NHL).

Off-season
On May 18, 2010, the Panthers introduced Dale Tallon as their new executive vice-president and general manager, replacing Randy Sexton. Sexton's contract expired June 30, 2010, and was thought to be retained in some other capacity with the club, but on July 3, 2010, Sexton was hired by the Pittsburgh Penguins to be the assistant director of amateur scouting.

On May 20, 2010, the Panthers announced that they would reduce seating capacity at the BankAtlantic Center to 17,040 by covering over 2,000 seats with tarpaulins. For select games, the team would remove the tarpaulins to increase capacity.

Regular season 
The Panthers finished in last place in both the Southeast Division and the Eastern Conference. On April 10, 2011, the Panthers fired head coach Peter DeBoer.

The Panthers' power play struggled during the regular season, as they finished 30th overall in power play percentage at just 13.11% (35 for 267).

Playoffs
The Panthers failed to make the playoffs, for the 11th consecutive year.

Standings

Divisional standings

Conference standings

Schedule and results
Panthers '10–'11 schedule at nhl.com

Game log

Player statistics

Skaters
Note: GP = Games played; G = Goals; A = Assists; Pts = Points; +/− = Plus/minus; PIM = Penalty minutes

Goaltenders
Note: GP = Games played; TOI = Time on ice (minutes); W = Wins; L = Losses; OT = Overtime losses; GA = Goals ; GAA= Goals against average; SA= Shots against; SV= Saves; Sv% = Save percentage; SO= Shutouts

†Denotes player spent time with another team before joining Panthers. Stats reflect time with Panthers only.
‡Traded mid-season
Bold/italics denotes franchise record

Awards and records

Awards

Records

Milestones

Transactions 

The Panthers have been involved in the following transactions during the 2010–11 season.

Trades

Notes

Free agents acquired

Free agents lost

Claimed via waivers

Lost via waivers

Player signings

Draft picks 
Florida's picks at the 2010 NHL Entry Draft in Los Angeles, California.

See also 
 2010–11 NHL season

Farm teams 
The Florida Panthers maintain affiliations with two minor league teams, the Rochester Americans of the American Hockey League and the Cincinnati Cyclones of the ECHL.

References 

Florida Panthers seasons
F
F
2010 in sports in Florida
2011 in sports in Florida